Namık Gedik (1911–1960) was a Turkish physician and politician who served as the minister of interior during the mid-1950s. He was a member of the Democrat Party which was the ruling party in the period 1950–1960. He was arrested on 27 May 1960 immediately following the military coup along with his colleagues. Gedik committed suicide soon after his detention.

Early life and education
Gedik hailed from a large family originated from Uşak. He was born in Trabzon in 1911 when his father was serving there as a post officer. He graduated from Kabataş High School in 1930 and received a bachelor's degree in medicine from Istanbul University in 1936.

Career
Following graduation Gedik began to work in Çine, Aydın, as a physician. In 1942 he completed his speciality training in medicine at Haydarpaşa Hospital, Istanbul, and worked at different medical institutions in various cities until 1950 when he resigned from the medical career and joined the Democrat Party. Gedik was one of the founders of the party. He became a member of the Turkish parliament following the 1950 general elections for Aydın and continued to serve in the parliament until 1960 winning a seat for Aydin in the general elections in 1954 and in the next elections in 1957.

Gedik served as minister of interior in the cabinets led by Prime Minister Adnan Menderes. Gedik was first appointed to the post on 17 May 1954, and his term ended on 10 September 1955 when he resigned from the office due to the 6-7 September incident, known as Istanbul pogrom. Ethem Menderes replaced Gedik in the post. Gedik was appointed to the same post for a second time on 22 December 1956 and remained in office until 27 May 1960. His both terms witnessed significant events, such as Istanbul pogrom and growing tensions with the Republican People's Party followers and other opposition forces. Following the military coup on 27 May 1960 Gedik and other Democrat Party members were arrested.

Personal life and death
Gedik married Melahat Gedik, a judge, in 1937. She joined True Path Party in the 1980s and served at the Turkish parliament representing Aydın. She died in 1999. Namık and Melahat Gedik had two children. His son, Arda Gedik, died in September 2011.

Namık Gedik committed suicide throwing himself out of a window in Ankara when he was in custody on 29 May 1960.

References

20th-century Turkish physicians
1911 births
1960 suicides
Ministers of the Interior of Turkey
Istanbul University Faculty of Medicine alumni
Deputies of Aydın
Democrat Party (Turkey, 1946–1961) politicians
Istanbul pogrom
Turkish politicians who committed suicide
Members of the 9th Parliament of Turkey
Members of the 10th Parliament of Turkey
Members of the 11th Parliament of Turkey
Kabataş Erkek Lisesi alumni